The following is a timeline of the history of the city of Wrocław, Poland.

Prior to 16th century
 around 550 - At the end of the Migration Period around and in the present areas of Wrocław, the Slavic tribe of Ślężanie settled. 
 985 - Mieszko I of Poland in power.
 1000
 Bishopric of Wrocław established.
 Population: 1,000 (approximate).
 1037 - Pagan Uprising.
 1038 - Bohemians in power.
 1054 - Poles in power.
 1109 - August 24: Battle of Hundsfeld (Psie Pole), Polish victory against the invading Germans.
 ca. 1112/1118 - Wrocław named one of the three major cities of the Polish Kingdom alongside Kraków and Sandomierz in the Gesta principum Polonorum.
 1138 - Town becomes capital of Duchy of Silesia within the fragmented Polish realm.

 around 1240 - Church of St. Vincent founded by High Duke of Poland Henry II the Pious.
 1241
 Town besieged by Mongols during the First Mongol invasion of Poland.
 Burial of Henry II the Pious, killed in the Battle of Legnica, in the Church of St. Vincent, as the first Polish monarch to be buried in Wrocław.
 1242 - Church of St. Giles built.
 1257 - Church of St. Elizabeth built.
 1262 - Magdeburg rights adopted.
 1272 - Cathedral of St. John the Baptist consecrated.
 1273 - Piwnica Świdnicka, one of the oldest still operating restaurants in Europe, opened.
 1274 - Duke Henryk IV Probus granted Wrocław staple right.
 1288 - Holy Cross church founded by High Duke of Poland Henryk IV Probus.
 1290 - Death and burial of Henryk IV Probus in the Holy Cross church, that was still under construction, as the second Polish monarch to be buried in Wrocław.
 1295 - Holy Cross church consecrated.
 1333 - Town Hall building expanded.
 1335 - City in the hands of Luxembourgs.
 1342 - Fire.
 1344 - Fire.
 1348 - Charles IV, Holy Roman Emperor visits the city.
 1351 - Saints Stanislaus, Dorothy and Wenceslaus church founded.
 1362 - St. Mary Magdalene Church built.
 1387 - City joins Hanseatic League.
 1418 - Guild revolt.
 1466 - Meeting of Polish diplomat Jan Długosz and the papal legate in Wrocław, which enabled peace talks between Poland and the Teutonic Order, which culminated a few months later in the signing of a peace treaty in Toruń ending the Thirteen Years' War.
 1469 - City passed to Hungarian King Matthias Corvinus.
 1474
 Siege by combined Polish-Bohemian forces.
 City leaves the Hanseatic League.

 1490 - End of Hungarian rule.
 1492 - Pillory erected at the Market Square.

16th–18th centuries
 1523 - Protestant Reformation.
 1526 - City passes to Austria.
 1530 - City coat of arms adopted.
 1585 - Plague.
 1666 - Polish Municipal School (Miejska Szkoła Polska) opened.
 1670 - Miscellanea Curiosa Medico-Physica, the world's first medical journal published.
 1672 - House of the Seven Electors built.
 1702 - Leopoldina Jesuit college founded.
 1717 - Palace built.
 1723 -  (publisher) in business.
 1741 - Prussians in power.
 1742 - Schlesische Zeitung begins publication.
 1757 - Austrians in power, succeeded by Prussians.
 1760 - City besieged.

19th century
 1806 - December: City besieged by forces of the Confederation of the Rhine.
 1807 - Old fortifications dismantled.
 1811 - Schlesische Friedrich-Wilhelm-Universität established.
 1813 - Mobilization against Napoleon of France.
 1815 - Royal Museum of Art and Antiquity established.
 1823 - Population: 76,813.
 1824 - Exchange built.
 1829 - White Stork Synagogue opens.
 1830 - Concert by Fryderyk Chopin.
 1833 - Horse racing in Szczytnicki Park begins.
 1836 - Slavonic Literary Society founded.

 1841 - Opera House opens.
 1842 - Upper Silesian Train Station built.
 1846 - Royal Palace building renovated.
 1854 - Jewish Theological Seminary founded.
 1856 - Jewish Cemetery established in Gabitz.
 1857 - Central Station opens.
 1861
 Local Poles join Polish national mourning after the massacre of Polish protesters by Russian troops in Warsaw in February 1861.
 City becomes an important center of preparations for the Polish January Uprising in the Russian Partition of Poland.
 Orchestral Society founded.
 1863
 Mass searches of Polish homes by the Prussian police after the outbreak of the January Uprising.
 June: City officially becomes the seat of secret Polish insurgent authorities.
 New City Hall built.
 1864 - January: Arrests of several members of the Polish insurgent movement by the Prussian police.
 1865
 Zoological Garden opens.
 Theatre built.
 1871
 City becomes part of German Empire.
 New Church of St. Michael consecrated.
 Opera house rebuilt.
 1872
 New Synagogue consecrated.
 Piast Brewery in business.
 1873 - Population: 208,025.
 1880 - Silesian Museum of Fine Arts established.
 1883
 St. Mauritius Bridge constructed.
 Lutheran Theological Seminar opens.
 1884 - Polish newspaper Nowiny Szląskie begins publication.
 1886 - Viadrina (Jewish student society) formed.
 1887 - "Government offices" built.
 1889 - Tumski Bridge constructed.
 1890 - Population: 335,186.
 1891 - Concert by Ignacy Jan Paderewski.
 1892 - Monopol Hotel built.

 1894
 Merchants Club built.
 "Sokół" Polish Gymnastic Society established, as the first branch of the organization in Silesia.
 1896 - Kleinburg (Dworek) and Pöpelwitz (Popowice) villages become part of city.
 1897 - Zwierzyniecki Bridge constructed.
 1899 - Silesian Museum of Applied Arts established.

20th century

1900–1939
 1901 - Concert by Ignacy Jan Paderewski.
 1903 - Flood.
 1904
 Herdain (Gaj) and Morgentau (Rakowiec) villages become part of city.
 Barasch Brothers' Department Store opens.
 1905
 Population: 470,751.
 Wrocław water tower built.

 1908 - Market Hall built.
 1909
 Theatre built.
 Jan Mikulicz-Radecki monument unveiled.
 1910
 Grunwaldzki Bridge built.
 Technische Hochschule was founded.
 1911 - Gräbschen (Grabiszyn) village becomes part of city.
 1913
 Centennial Hall and Exhibition Grounds built.
 Union of Jewish Liberal Youth organized.
 1916 - Turnip winter (food rationing).
 1919 - City becomes capital of Province of Lower Silesia.
 1920
 May - Consulate of the Republic of Poland opened.
 August - Polish consulate attacked and demolished by a German nationalist militia.
 1924 - Local branch of the Union of Poles in Germany founded.
 1926 - Palace Museum opens.
 1927 - Polish scout troop founded.
 1929 - Workplace and House Exhibition held.

 1930
 Wertheim Department Store opens.
 June: City hosts Deutsche Kampfspiele.
 12 September: Hitler gives campaign speech at the Centennial Hall.
 1932 - Conflict between Communists and Nazis.
 1933
 January: Riots.
 March: KZ Dürrgoy, one of the first Nazi concentration camps, established in the present-day district of Tarnogaj.
 August: KZ Dürrgoy disestablished.
 1938
 July: Deutsches Turn- und Sportfest 1938 held.
 November 9–10: Kristallnacht pogrom against Jews.
 Airport built.
 1939
 June: Expulsion of Polish students from the university.
 August: Headquarters of several local Polish organizations, known as the Polish House, searched by the Gestapo and closed down.

World War II (1939–1945)
 1939
 September: City made the headquarters of the southern district of the Selbstschutz, led by SS-Oberführer Fritz Katzmann, which task was to commit atrocities against Poles during the German invasion of Poland.
 September: Mass arrests of Polish activists, Polish organizations banned.
 1940
 Ausländer-Auffanglager forced labour camp established by the Germans; its prisoners were mostly Poles, but also Frenchmen, Czechs, Ukrainians, Hungarians, Yugoslavs, Greeks, etc. (mostly men, but also women and children)
 Rheinmettal–Borsig forced labour camp established by the Germans; its prisoners were mostly Poles (men and women), but also Czechs (men and women), French POWs, Soviet POWs and Jews.
 Forced labour camp in Sołtysowice established by the Germans; it housed between 4,000 and 10,000 prisoners, mostly Poles, but also Czechs, Ukrainians, Yugoslavs, Frenchmen, Englishmen, Dutchmen and Russians.
 20 April: Forced labour camp for Jewish men established by the Germans in the present-day district of Jerzmanowo.
 September: Forced labour camp for Jews established by the Germans in Żerniki.

 1941 - Olimp underground Polish resistance organization formed.
 1942
 15 February: Forced labour camp for Jewish men in Jerzmanowo dissolved.
 August: AL Breslau-Lissa subcamp of the Gross-Rosen concentration camp established by the Germans, its prisoners were mostly Poles, but also Russians, Ukrainians, Germans, Frenchmen, Czechs, Yugoslavs.
 1943
 April 23: Polish Zagra-Lin attacks Nazi German troop transport.
 Dulag 410 transit camp for Allied prisoners of war established by the Germans.
 1944
 March: Forced labour camp for Jews in Żerniki dissolved.
 August: City declared a Nazi fortress.
 Three more subcamps of the Gross-Rosen concentration camp established, for prisoners of various nationalities, including one subcamp for women.
 Deportations of Poles from Warsaw to the forced labour camp in Sołtysowice following the Warsaw Uprising.
 Prisoners of the Rheinmettal–Borsig forced labour camp evacuated to the Gross-Rosen concentration camp in a death march.
 1945
 January: evacuation of the prisoners of the Gross-Rosen subcamps to the main camp in death marches.
 20 January: Rheinmettal–Borsig forced labour camp dissolved.
 January–April: Construction of a temporary airport, during which thousands of forced labourers were killed.
 February 13-May 6: Siege of Breslau.
 April: Bombing of the Ausländer-Auffanglager forced labour camp; death of many prisoners.
 May 7: Forced labour camp in Sołtysowice dissolved.
 Polish Boleslaw Drobner becomes mayor.
 Expulsion of Germans in accordance with the Potsdam Agreement begins.
 June: Deportation of captured German POWs to the Soviet Union by the Russians.

1946–1990s
 1946
 Ossolineum relocates to Wrocław from Lviv.
 Academy of Fine Arts and Academy for the Dramatic Arts established.
 Wrocław Puppet Theater active.

 1947 - National Museum, Wrocław, and Trade College established.
 1948 - Iglica installed.
 1950 - Wrocław Medical University established.
 1951
 Bieńkowice, Brochów, Jagodno, Muchobór Wielki, Oporów, Sołtysowice, Wojnów, Wojszyce, Zakrzów, Zgorzelisko villages become part of city.
 Agricultural University established.
 1956
 Pantomima established.
 Mass raising of medical supplies and blood donation for the Hungarian Revolution of 1956.
 1958 - Śląsk Wrocław wins its first Polish handball championship.
 1959
 Wojewódzki Bridge constructed.
 Memorial to the Victims of Nazi Terror erected near the former forced labour camp in Sołtysowice.
 1963 - Wrocław hosts the EuroBasket 1963.
 1964 - Unveiling of the monument to Polish professors from Lwów, murdered by the Germans during the occupation of Poland in 1941 (see also: Massacre of Lwów professors).
 1965
 Museum of Architecture established.
 Teatr Laboratorium active.
 Śląsk Wrocław wins its first Polish basketball championship.
 1974
 Nicolaus Copernicus monument unveiled.
 Population: 565,000.
 1975
 City becomes capital of Wrocław Voivodeship.
 Śląsk Wrocław wins its tenth Polish handball championship.
 1977 - Śląsk Wrocław wins its first Polish football championship.
 1980 - Gwardia Wrocław wins its first Polish volleyball championship.
 1982 - Fighting Solidarity organization founded.
 1984 - Juliusz Słowacki monument unveiled.
 1985 - Raclawice Panorama re-opens.
 1986 - Stefan Skapski becomes mayor.
 1991 - Sister city partnership signed between Wrocław and Breda, Netherlands.
 1993
 Śląsk Wrocław wins its tenth Polish basketball championship.
 Sparta Wrocław wins its first Polish speedway championship.
 1994 - Constitution of 3 May 1791 monument unveiled.
 1995 - May 10: Wrocław hosts the first Speedway Grand Prix event in history, won by Tomasz Gollob.

 1997
 May: Visit of Pope John Paul II.
 July: Millennium Flood.
 1999 - City becomes capital of Lower Silesian Voivodeship.
 2000 - May: Wrocław hosts the 2000 European Judo Championships.

21st century

 2001 - New Horizons Film Festival begins.
 2002
 Rafal Dutkiewicz becomes mayor.
 Land Forces Military Academy established.
 2003 - March 30: Football riot.
 2004 - Fryderyk Chopin monument unveiled.
 2006 - Monument to the heroes of the Hungarian Revolution of 1956 unveiled.
 2009
 April 25: Renoma department store re-opens.
 June 4: Multimedia Fountain installed.
 September: Wrocław co-hosts the EuroBasket 2009.
 2010
 July: Wrocław hosts the 2010 Acrobatic Gymnastics World Championships.
 October: American Film Festival begins.

 2011
 Redzinski Bridge and Municipal Stadium open.
 May 25: Monument to Witold Pilecki unveiled.
 Population: 631,235.
 2012
 June: City co-hosts the UEFA Euro 2012.
 September: Khachkar unveiled.
 2013 - Wrocław hosts the 2013 World Weightlifting Championships.
 2014
 August–September: Wrocław co-hosts the 2014 FIVB Volleyball Men's World Championship.
 November: Wojciech Korfanty monument unveiled.

 2016
 City named World Book Capital by UNESCO.
 January 12: Honorary Consulate of Latvia opened.
 January 15–31: Wrocław co-hosts the 2016 European Men's Handball Championship.
 April: Honorary Consulate of Norway opened.
 2017 - Wrocław hosts the 2017 World Games.
 2018
 June: Ignacy Jan Paderewski monument unveiled.
 3 October: Sister city partnership signed between Wrocław and Oxford, United Kingdom.
 2019 - Honorary Consulate of Estonia opened.

See also
 History of Wrocław
 List of mayors of Wrocław
 List of bishops of Wrocław
 Category:Timelines of cities in Poland (in Polish)

References 

This article incorporates information from the Polish Wikipedia and German Wikipedia.

Bibliography

in English

in other languages
 
  (bibliography)

External links

 Links to fulltext city directories for Breslau via Wikisource
 Europeana. Items related to Wroclaw, various dates.

Wroclaw
wroclaw
Years in Poland